Mount Lopez is a peak of the Walker Mountains, located  east of Landfall Peak in the western part of Thurston Island, Antarctica. It was delineated from aerial photographs taken by U.S. Navy Operation Highjump, 1946–47, and was named by the Advisory Committee on Antarctic Names for Ensign Maxwell A. Lopez of the U.S. Navy, a member of the expedition who lost his life in a seaplane crash at Thurston Island on December 30, 1946.

See also
 Mountains in Antarctica

Maps
 Thurston Island – Jones Mountains. 1:500000 Antarctica Sketch Map. US Geological Survey, 1967.
 Antarctic Digital Database (ADD). Scale 1:250000 topographic map of Antarctica. Scientific Committee on Antarctic Research (SCAR). Since 1993, regularly upgraded and updated.

References

Mountains of Ellsworth Land
Thurston Island